An iodide nitride is a mixed anion compound containing both iodide (I−) and nitride ions (N3−). Another name is metalloiodonitrides. They are a subclass of halide nitrides or pnictide halides. Some different kinds include ionic alkali or alkaline earth salts, small clusters where metal atoms surround a nitrogen atom, layered group 4 element 2-dimensional structures (which could be exfoliated to a monolayer), and transition metal nitrido complexes counter-balanced with iodide ions. There is also a family with rare earth elements and nitrogen and sulfur in a cluster. 

Related mixed-anion compounds include halogen variations: nitride fluoride, nitride chloride, and nitride bromide, and pnictogen variations phosphide iodide, arsenide iodide  and antimonide iodides.

Production 
Nitride iodides may be produced by heating metal nitrides with metal iodides. The ammonolysis process heats a metal iodide with ammonia. A related method heats a metal or metal hydride with ammonium iodide. The nitrogen source could also be an azide or an amide.

List

References

Iodides
Mixed anion compounds
Nitrides